Bank Polska Kasa Opieki Spółka Akcyjna, commonly using the shorter name Bank Pekao S.A., is a universal bank and currently the second largest bank in Poland with its headquarters in Warsaw. The Italian bank UniCredit used to own 59% of the company. It sold the bank in December 2016. Now Powszechny Zakład Ubezpieczeń owns 20% of the company, Polish Development Fund 12.80%, UniCredit 6.28% and others 60.94%.

The bank was founded in 1929 by the Ministry of Treasury as a national bank, mainly to provide financial services to Poles living abroad. In 1939 the bank had branches in virtually every capital city of countries where Poles lived.

The full name "Polska Kasa Opieki" may be translated literally as "Polish Bank of Aid", and the popular form "Pekao" sounds out the acronym "PKO".

History

Formative years
In 1929, the CEO of Pocztowa Kasa Oszczędności, Henryk Gruber, observed that there was a demand for a bank that could provide financial services to the eight million Poles living outside the country. Starting from these assumptions, on March 17, 1929, the Ministry of Finance established Bank Polska Kasa Opieki Spółka Akcyjna. On October 29 of the same year, the Warsaw District Court entered Bank Polska Kasa Opieki SA in the commercial register. The company's shareholders were Pocztowa Kasa Oszczędności, Bank Gospodarstwa Krajowego and Państwowy Bank Rolny.
The first branches were opened in France, Argentina, and the United States, and in Tel Aviv (now Israel). By 1939 Pekao had branches in the capitals of most countries where Polish emigres had settled.

People's Republic of Poland
After the end of World War II and the beginning of the Soviet domination in Poland , the bank took care of international financial operations conducted by the authorities of the newly established Polish People's Republic. With the bank's help, the Poles who live abroad could support their families behind the Iron Curtain. In 1968, the Minister of Finance authorized the establishment of foreign currency accounts for persons working abroad in Bank Pekao. Monopoly on their conduct Pekao lost only in 1989 with the onset of economic reforms that swept in Poland and the communist bloc.

In the 1970s, currency accounts in Pekao were divided into three categories: Account A for people paying currencies with documented origin, B accounts for payments with undocumented origin, and C accounts for foreigners. The funds from B accounts could not be legally exported abroad, but in 1976 the rights of A and B accounts were leveled. In 1974, the bank had around 91,000 registered accounts. At the end of the 1980s, the total value of foreign currency accounts was US$3.3 billion.

Much earlier, in 1960, the bank began issuing its own vouchers, "Bon Towarowy PeKaO", denominated in US dollars. Initially, for these vouchers (as well as directly for convertible currencies deposited in domestic and foreign bank representations) it was possible to buy both foreign and deficit domestic goods in the foreign sales network operated directly by Bank Pekao. The offer of the bank for individual clients included a variety of goods covering, among others, groceries (including "Krakus" ham and western chewing gum), alcohol, cosmetics, textiles, household appliances, bicycles, motorcycles, cars, trucks, tractors, agricultural machinery, fuel, building materials, installation and sanitary equipment, and also apartments and furniture. This retail network was created with the establishment of the Pewex "internal export" company, in 1972 out of the bank's structures.

Third Polish Republic (1989–present)

On 3 August 1999, Pekao became a member of the UniCredit company.

In December 2016, Polish state-owned PZU together with Polish Development Fund acquired Bank Pekao Poland's second largest bank previously owned by Italian bank UniCredit by buying a 32.8% stake in the bank for the amount of PLN 10.6 billion (EUR 2.6 billion).

List of directors 
List of Bank Pekao CEOs:

 Marian Kanton (1989–1996) 
 Andrzej Dorosz (1996–1998)
 Maria Pasło-Wiśniewska (1998–2003)
 Jan Krzysztof Bielecki (2003–2010)
 Alicja Kornasiewicz (2010–2011)
 Luigi Lovaglio (2011–2017)
 Michał Krupiński (2017–2019)
 Marek Lusztyn (2019–2020)
 Leszek Skiba (2020–)

Pekao Group
Apart from Pekao Bank, Pekao Group's subsidiaries are:

 Centralny Dom Maklerski Pekao SA
 Centrum Bankowości Bezpośredniej Sp. z o.o. (call center)
 Pekao Leasing Sp. z o.o.
 Pekao Investment Banking SA
 Pekao Leasing Holding SA 
 Pekao Leasing Sp. z o.o. 
 Pekao Faktoring Sp. z o.o. 
 Pekao Pioneer Powszechne Towarzystwo Emerytalne SA 
 Centrum Kart S.A 
 Pekao Bank Hipoteczny SA (działalność bankowa)
 Pekao Financial Services Sp. z o.o. 
 Pekao Fundusz Kapitałowy Sp. z o.o. 
 Pekao Property SA 
 FPB – Media Sp. z o.o.

Miscellaneous 
Bank Pekao was the official bank and sponsor of the UEFA EURO in 2012.

Gallery

See also
 Bon PeKaO
 Ukrsotsbank

References

External links 
 Pekao Bank's history page

Government-owned companies of Poland
Banks of Poland
Banks established in 1929
Companies based in Warsaw
Former UniCredit subsidiaries
1929 establishments in Poland
Companies listed on the Warsaw Stock Exchange
Polish brands
Companies set up in the Second Republic of Poland